"We Hold On" is the second single released by Australian singer Kaz James. The song is included on the singer's 2008 debut solo album, If They Knew. It peaked at #81 on the ARIA pop chart and at #2 on the ARIA dance chart in Australia.

Track listing
Australian CD single
 We Hold On - 3:31
 We Hold On (Adam K & Soha Remix) - 5:43
 We Hold On (Extended Club Mix) - 4:58

iTunes Bonus Track
4. We Hold On (Burns Mix) - 6:35

Charts

Release history

References

2008 singles
Kaz James songs
2008 songs
Sony BMG singles